The Battle of Basra was a battle of World War I which took place south of the city of Basra (modern-day Iraq) between British and Ottoman troops from November 11 to November 22, 1914. The battle resulted in the British capture of Basra.

Background
After the capture of Fao by the British, the Ottoman army began to converge on Basra.  The British had the mission of securing the Persian oil fields by capturing Basra, and they advanced up the river towards Basra.

The battle
On November 7, 1914, British troops began the march from Fao to Basra.  The Ottomans attacked the British camp at dawn on November 11, but were defeated.  The Ottomans prepared defensive positions at Saihan, and on November 15 the British attacked.  The Ottomans were beaten, suffering 250 casualties and the British continued to advance.   The main Ottoman position was at a place the British called Sahil.  The Ottomans had 4,500 soldiers dug in near some palm groves and an old mud walled fort.  On November 19, the British advanced with two brigades of British and Indian infantry, some artillery and cavalry.  Their advance was hampered by a rain storm, which made movement difficult.  Ottoman fire, both rifle and artillery, was inaccurate.  The British and Indian troops pressed on and when they came close the British artillery finally found the range, bringing fire directly upon the Ottoman trenches.  The mud walled fort fell, and with that the entire Ottoman force got up and ran.  Due to the condition of the ground, the cavalry was unable to pursue.  Ottoman losses were maybe 1,000; the British and Indian troops lost 350.   On the river, the British gunboats encountered a launch with a deputation from Basra to tell the British that the city had been abandoned by the Ottomans, asking for troops to occupy it and stop looting.  Several battalions were loaded on the gunboats and on November 22, the Indian troops of the 104th Wellesley Rifles and 117th Mahrattas occupied Basra.

Aftermath
The capture of Basra was a major step in protecting the Persian oilfields and refineries.  However, the ambiguity of the mission would lead to mission creep that would lead the British to advance up the river.

Bibliography 
Notes

References 

 - Total pages: 449 
 - Total pages: 624
   
 

1914 in the Ottoman Empire
Battles of the Mesopotamian campaign
Battles of World War I involving the Ottoman Empire
Battles of World War I involving the United Kingdom
Battles of World War I involving British India
Conflicts in 1914
Battle 1914
November 1914 events